The Roman Catholic Diocese of Baoding/Ching-Yüan/Qingyuan  is a diocese located in the city of Baoding in the Ecclesiastical province of Beijing in China.

History
 February 14, 1910: Established as the Apostolic Vicariate of Central Chi-Li 直隸中境 from Apostolic Vicariate of Northern Chi-Li 直隸北境
 December 3, 1924: Renamed as Apostolic Vicariate of Baodingfu 保定府
 April 11, 1946: Promoted as Diocese of Baoding 保定

Special churches
National Shrine:
中华圣母国家朝圣地(National Shrine of Our Lady of China), Donglu

Leadership
 Bishops of Baoding 保定 (Roman rite)
 Bishop Su Zhi-Ming ( December 21, 1995 -
 Bishop Peter Joseph Fan Xueyan (April 12, 1951 – April 16, 1992)
 Bishop [{John Zhang Bi-de (July 19, 1946 - June 1951), while Bishop of Zhaoxian 趙縣 (China) (1946.04.11 – 1953.02.13)
 Bishop Joseph Zhou Ji-shi, C.M. (later Archbishop) (April 11, 1946 – July 18, 1946)
 Bishop An Shuxin (arrested by the Chinese government in 1997 and released in 2006)
 Vicars Apostolic of Baodingfu 保定府 (Roman Rite)
 Bishop Joseph Zhou Ji-shi, C.M. (later Archbishop) (March 26, 1931 – April 11, 1946)
 Bishop Paul Leon Cornelius Montaigne, C.M. (December 18, 1924 – January 25, 1930)
 Vicars Apostolic of Central Chi-Li 直隸中境 (Roman Rite)
 Bishop Joseph-Sylvain-Marius Fabrègues, C.M. (February 19, 1910 – June 12, 1923)

References
 
 

Roman Catholic dioceses in China
Christian organizations established in 1910
Baoding
Roman Catholic dioceses and prelatures established in the 20th century
1910 establishments in China
Christianity in Hebei